Samuel Wembé (1 January 1947 – 12 April 2020) was a Cameroonian businessman who also served as a deputy in the Cameroon National Assembly.

Biography
Wembé was born on 1 January 1947 in French Cameroon. He once served as a Deputy for Mifi. He was heavily involved in importation and exportation in Douala. He also served as chairman of the board of directors of RC Bafoussam.

Samuel Wembé died on 12 April 2020 in Douala at the age of 73 due to COVID-19.

References

1947 births
2020 deaths
Members of the National Assembly (Cameroon)
People from Douala
21st-century Cameroonian politicians
Deaths from the COVID-19 pandemic in Cameroon